The Morningside World of Stuart McLean (1989) is a collection of radio essays that first aired on CBC Radio's national weekday morning show "Morningside" hosted by Peter Gzowski.  In the 1980s Stuart McLean appeared as a regular contributor and occasional host on the show and his slice-of-life storytelling charmed listeners across the country.  The book became a Canadian bestseller.

See also
Stuart McLean
Morningside

References

External links
Stuart McLean profile at cbc.ca

1989 books
Books by Stuart McLean
Canadian non-fiction books